Baron Grantchester, of Knightsbridge in the City of Westminster, is a title in the Peerage of the United Kingdom. It was created on 30 June 1953 for the banker and Liberal politician Alfred Suenson-Taylor. , the title is held by his grandson, the third Baron, who succeeded his father in 1995. In 2003, he replaced the deceased Lord Milner of Leeds as one of the ninety elected hereditary peers that are allowed to remain in the House of Lords after the passing of the House of Lords Act 1999. Lord Grantchester sits on the Labour benches.

The family seat is Lower House Farm, near Audlem, Cheshire.

Barons Grantchester (1953)
Alfred Jesse Suenson-Taylor, 1st Baron Grantchester (1893–1976)
Kenneth Bent Suenson-Taylor, 2nd Baron Grantchester (1921–1995)
Christopher John Suenson-Taylor, 3rd Baron Grantchester (b. 1951)

The heir apparent is the present holder's son the Hon. Jesse David Suenson-Taylor (b. 1977)

Line of Succession

  Alfred Jesse Taylor, 1st Baron Grantchester (1893—1976)
  Kenneth Bent Suenson-Taylor, 2nd Baron Grantchester (1921—1995)
  Christopher John Suenson-Taylor, 3rd Baron Grantchester (born 1951) Ejected 1999; elected to remain in 2003, taking Lord Milner of Leeds's room.
 (1) Hon. Jesse David Jaffe Suenson-Taylor (b. 1977)
 (2) Hon. Adam Joel Suenson-Taylor (b. 1987)
 (3) Hon. Jeremy Kenneth Suenson-Taylor (b. 1951)
 (4) Rowan Suenson-Taylor (b. 1974)
 (5) Laurel Suenson-Taylor (b. 1979)
 (6) Daniel Suenson-Taylor (b. 1983)
 (7) Hon. James Gunnar Suenson-Taylor (b. 1955)
 (8) Andrew James Suenson-Taylor (b. 1985)
 (9) Jonathan Gunnar Suenson-Taylor (b. 1991)

Arms

Notes

References
Kidd, Charles, Williamson, David (editors). Debrett's Peerage and Baronetage (1990 edition). New York: St Martin's Press, 1990, 

Baronies in the Peerage of the United Kingdom
Noble titles created in 1953